Madera South High School (also known as Madera South, Madera South High or MSHS) is a high school located in Madera, California and is part of the Madera Unified School District.  Previously functioning as the second campus of the town's other high school, Madera High, the school officially became Madera's second official high school in August 2006.

Courses
Similar to Madera High School, Madera South High features many "career schools"—i.e., mini-schools located within the campus, customized for whichever career a student wishes to choose from.  Current career schools include:

Agriculture
Business/Human Services (originally two separate career schools prior to 2006)
Humanities (performing arts, etc.)
Health Sciences

Athletics
Madera South High School competes in the North Yosemite League of the CIF Central Section

Fall Sports:
Cross country
Football                    
Girls Golf
Girls Tennis
Girls Volleyball
Gymnastics
Water polo
Cheer & Dance

Winter Sports:
Girls Basketball
Boys Basketball
Boys Soccer
Girls Soccer
Wrestling
Cheer & Dance

Spring Sports:
Baseball
Boys Golf
Softball
Boys Tennis
Swimming
Track and field 
Boys Volleyball

Agriculture
The Agriculture Department is the crowning jewel of Madera South High School and it hosts the Madera FFA Chapter. 
The Madera FFA Chapter was founded at the same time as the National FFA Organization in 1928. Since then Madera FFA has experienced  years of excellence.

First graduating class
In 2009, Madera South graduated their first class as a high school. Even though the Class of 2009 was mixed with Madera High students their freshman year (2005–2006), the two schools were completely separated by their senior year (2008–2009)

Feeder schools 
The middle schools that feed into Madera South are: Martin Luther King Jr, Middle School and Jack G. Desmond, Middle School.

The elementary schools that feed into the two middle schools are:

Jack G. Desmond Middle School, Berenda Elementary School, Nishimoto Elementary School, James Monroe Elementary School, and Pershing Elementary School.

Martin Luther King Jr, Middle School- Alpha Elementary School, Chavez Elementary School, Millview Elementary School, and Sierra Vista Elementary School.

References 

High schools in Madera County, California
Public high schools in California
1990 establishments in California